Oussama Darragi (born 3 April 1987) is a Tunisian professional footballer who plays as an attacking midfielder.

Club career
Darragi was chosen as the best player in the Tunisian league for the year 2010.

After contributing to Ésperance de Tunis winning the Tunisian League, the Tunisian Cup and the CAF Champions League, he was named the African-based Player of the Year for 2011 by the Confederation of African Football.

In January 2020, he joined JS Kabylie from Club Africain.

International career
Darragi was called up to the Tunisia national team's squad for the 2010 FIFA World Cup qualifiers. On 6 September 2009, Tunisia travelled to face Nigeria in a crucial qualifier. With the visitors trailing 2–1, Darragi scored in the 89th minute to earn a draw for his team.

International goals
Scores and results list Tunisia's goal tally first, score column indicates score after each Darragi goal.

Honours
Individual
 African-based Player of the Year: 2011

References

1987 births
Living people
Association football midfielders
Tunisian footballers
Espérance Sportive de Tunis players
FC Sion players
Al-Raed FC players
CA Bizertin players
Club Africain players
Umm Salal SC players
Wydad AC players
JS Kabylie players
Tunisian Ligue Professionnelle 1 players
Swiss Super League players
Saudi Professional League players
Qatar Stars League players
Algerian Ligue Professionnelle 1 players
Tunisian expatriate footballers
Expatriate footballers in Switzerland
Expatriate footballers in Saudi Arabia
Expatriate footballers in Qatar
Expatriate footballers in Algeria
Tunisian expatriate sportspeople in Switzerland
Tunisian expatriate sportspeople in Saudi Arabia
Tunisian expatriate sportspeople in Qatar
Tunisia international footballers
2010 Africa Cup of Nations players
Tunisian people of Algerian descent
2011 African Nations Championship players
2012 Africa Cup of Nations players
2013 Africa Cup of Nations players
Tunisia A' international footballers
Footballers from Tunis